Freeholder may refer to:

 one who is in freehold (law)
 one who holds title to real property in fee simple
 County Commissioner, an official of county government in the U.S. state of New Jersey that was formerly referred to as a freeholder.